Natasha Brown is an anchor and reporter at KYW in Philadelphia. She reports for the station's CBS News Philadelphia on weeknights and is the current solo anchor of  CBS News Philadelphia @ 9am & co-anchor at 4pm on weekdays alongside anchor Siafa Lewis, who joined her in November 2021 after departing Chicago station WMAQ-TV. She joined the station in December 2002 as morning anchor and reporter.
She is also host of Speak Up, a public affairs program on WPSG.
She graduated from James Madison University, where she earned a Bachelor of Arts degree in Communications.
Prior to joining KYW, she worked as a reporter at WPXI-TV in Pittsburgh, Pennsylvania. She previously worked as weekend anchor and reporter at WWBT-TV in Richmond, Virginia. Brown began her career as a reporter at WPDE-TV in Myrtle Beach, South Carolina. Brown has received three Emmy awards for her excellence in reporting, and was inducted in 2016 to the Broadcast Pioneers of Philadelphia hall of fame. NAACP awarded her the Most Influential Black Woman twice.

References

External links 
 https://www.cbsnews.com/philadelphia/personality/natasha-brown/
 http://www.jmu.edu/madisononline/madison/wm_library/SUM07_P72-CVR4.pd PDF
 Broadcast Pioneers of Philadelphia

21st-century African-American people
African-American television personalities
James Madison University alumni
Living people
Philadelphia television reporters
Television anchors from Philadelphia
Year of birth missing (living people)